Estia Health is an Australian aged care operator floated by Quadrant Private Equity in December 2014 when it was valued at $725 million.

It operates 69 facilities across Australia and is listed on the Australian Securities Exchange.  

The company lost about a sixth of its value in September 2018 when the government announced a public inquiry into misconduct in the aged care sector, following the Australian Broadcasting Corporation produced a two-part documentary focusing on alleged neglect and abuse of older people.

It was founded by Peter Arvanitis.  He resigned in 2016.

In 2018 it had the largest proportion of women in its executive team.

It acquired 4 residential aged care homes and 2 development sites worth more than $100m from Premier Health Care Group in 2022.  They will add 409 resident places to their portfolio and two development sites could deliver a further 160-179.

See also 
 Heritage Care

References 

Companies listed on the Australian Securities Exchange
Aged care in Australia
Companies based in Sydney
Health care companies of Australia